Trogia is a genus of fungi in the family Marasmiaceae. It is named after a Swiss mycologist Jacob Gabriel Trog. The genus contains about 20 species that are widely distributed in tropical areas.

Taxonomy
The genus was first circumscribed by Elias Magnus Fries in 1835. He set the type species as Trogia montagnei, a species that had been described by French mycologist Camille Montagne in 1834 as Cantharellus aplorutis. The type has since been lost, and as a result, there has been some historical disagreement as to the boundaries of the genus. The British botanist Edred John Henry Corner emended the genus in 1966 to include 56 species. Rolf Singer disagreed with this broad species concept in the fourth edition of his Agaricales in Modern Taxonomy (1986), and only included three species: T. cantharelloides, T. buccinalis, and T. montagnei. He considered most of the species included by Corner as better placed in genera like Hemimycena, Mycena, Gerronema, Hydropus, and Hymenogloea. Corner later defended his species concept in a 1991 publication.

Description
The genus contains species with clitocyboid (gilled mushrooms that lack partial veils and feature white, yellowish, or pinkish spore prints) to omphalinoid (mushroom with a decurrent gill attachment, a cartilage-like stem, a broad or depressed cap surface and lacking a ring and volva) fruit body types. The fruit bodies are tough when dry, but can revive when moistened. They grow on rotting wood or woody material.

Distribution
Species in the genus are found in tropical and subtropical areas. Trogia cantharelloides (Mont.) Pat. is a widespread neotropical species, recorded from Puerto Rico, and Cuba among other places.

Uses
As a wood-rotting fungus genus, species of Trogia have enzymes that break down lignin, a complex polysaccharide that is largely responsible for giving wood its strength. Trogia buccinalis has been investigated for its ability to use these enzymes to break down common pollutant molecules such as anthracene, pentachlorophenol, and polyvinylchloride.

Yunnan Sudden Death Syndrome

One species, Trogia venenata, colloquially known as "little white" has been implicated in the deaths of around 400 people in Yunnan province, southwestern China. Appearing after local rainfall, the mushrooms contain toxic amino acids and seem to be cardiotoxic in susceptible people, causing fatal arrhythmia. The amino acids are not used in proteins, and one is new to science, According to taxonomist Yang Zhuliang, Trogia was not previously thought to contain poisonous species. A team led by Chinese Center for Disease Control and Prevention epidemiologist Zeng Guang suggested that the element barium, present in local foods and contaminated water, may increase the toxicity of the Trogia mushroom. This has been disproved by later studies.

Species
The 10th edition of the Dictionary of the Fungi (2008) estimated there were about 20 species in the genus. , Index Fungorum list 74 valid species in the genus.

Trogia alba
Trogia aphylla
Trogia aplorutis
Trogia aquosa
Trogia aurantiphylla
Trogia borneoensis
Trogia brevipes
Trogia buccinalis
Trogia calyculus
Trogia cantharelloides
Trogia carminea
Trogia caryotae
Trogia ceraceomollis
Trogia cervina
Trogia cinerea
Trogia crinipelliformis
Trogia cyanea
Trogia delicata
Trogia diminutiva
Trogia exigua
Trogia fuliginea
Trogia fulvochracea
Trogia furcata
Trogia fuscoalba
Trogia fuscolutea
Trogia fuscomellea
Trogia ghesquierei
Trogia grisea
Trogia hispidula
Trogia holochlora
Trogia icterina
Trogia impartita
Trogia inaequalis
Trogia lilaceogrisea
Trogia limonosporoides
Trogia macra
Trogia mammillata
Trogia mellea
Trogia mycenoides
Trogia nigrescens
Trogia nitrosa
Trogia ochrophylla
Trogia octava
Trogia odorata
Trogia omphalinoides
Trogia pallida
Trogia papillata
Trogia papyracea
Trogia pleurotoides
Trogia polyadelpha
Trogia primulina
Trogia raphanolens
Trogia revoluta
Trogia rivulosa
Trogia rosea
Trogia rubida
Trogia seriflua
Trogia silvae-araucariae
Trogia silvestris
Trogia straminea
Trogia subdistans
Trogia subgelatinosa
Trogia subglobospora
Trogia sublateralis
Trogia subrufescens
Trogia subtomentosa
Trogia subtranslucens
Trogia subviridis
Trogia tenax
Trogia tricholomatoides
Trogia umbonata
Trogia umbrinoalba
Trogia venenata
Trogia violaceogrisea

See also

List of Marasmiaceae genera

References

Marasmiaceae
Agaricales genera